Jack Carthy (born 8 August 1996 in Haworth, West Yorkshire, England) is a trials rider who competes in the 26-inch category. He is the reigning UCI elite world champion and UCI World Cup champion.

Career
Carthy began competing on the elite UCI Trials World Cup in 2012. He finished third in his first World Cup event in Aalter, Belgium aged just 15. He won the overall Elite World Cup title in 2014 while still a junior, winning 3 of the 5 rounds. He successfully defended his World Cup title in 2015 and 2016 and is thus the reigning UCI World Cup champion.

Carthy was junior UCI world champion in 2013 and 2014 and junior European champion in 2014. In the Elite category in 2015 he was European champion and finished second in the UCI World Championships in Vallnord, Andorra.

In 2016 Carthy won the 2016 UCI World Championship in the elite 26-inch category in Val di Sole, Italy. He was the first British rider to win a UCI Elite Trials World Championship in any category. He retained his title in 2017, winning at the UCI Urban Cycling World Championships in China.

Major events timeline

References

External links
 Official website

British male cyclists
Mountain bike trials riders
UCI Mountain Bike World Champions (men)
Living people
1996 births
21st-century British people